The Women's 10 km competition at the 2022 World Aquatics Championships was held on 29 June 2022.

Results
The race was started at 08:00.

References

Women's 10 km
Women's 10 km open water